Julian Dean Rijkhoff (born 25 January 2005) is a Dutch footballer currently playing as a forward for Borussia Dortmund.

Club career
Rijkhoff started his career with local side FC Purmerend, before a move to Ajax in 2012. In 2021 he made a controversial move to Germany to sign for Borussia Dortmund, with Dutch footballing legend Marco van Basten criticising the deal.

In September 2022, he was named by English newspaper The Guardian as one of the best players born in 2005 worldwide.

References

External links
 

2005 births
Living people
Dutch footballers
Netherlands youth international footballers
Association football forwards
AFC Ajax players
Borussia Dortmund players
Dutch expatriate footballers
Dutch expatriate sportspeople in Germany
Expatriate footballers in Germany